Lori McNeil and Mercedes Paz were the defending champions but only Paz competed that year with Gabriela Sabatini.

Paz and Sabatini won in the final 6–2, 6–2 against Jill Hetherington and Christiane Jolissaint.

Seeds
Champion seeds are indicated in bold text while text in italics indicates the round in which those seeds were eliminated. All eight seeded teams received byes into the second round.

Draw

Final

Top half

Bottom half

External links
 1987 WTA Argentine Open Doubles Draw

WTA Argentine Open
1988 WTA Tour
ATP